Shirley Anne Burgess (born about 1934) was a female athlete who competed for England.

Athletics career
She represented England and won a silver medal in the 4 x 110 Yard Relay at the 1954 British Empire and Commonwealth Games in Vancouver, Canada and also competed in the 100 and 220 yards. She also represented Woolwich Polytechnic.

References

1934 births
English female sprinters
Athletes (track and field) at the 1954 British Empire and Commonwealth Games
Commonwealth Games medallists in athletics
Commonwealth Games bronze medallists for England
Living people
Medallists at the 1954 British Empire and Commonwealth Games